Gary Charles "Gar" Samuelson (February 18, 1958 – July 14, 1999) was an American musician best remembered for being the drummer for thrash metal band Megadeth from 1984 to 1987, contributing to their first two albums, Killing Is My Business... and Business Is Good! (1985) and Peace Sells... but Who's Buying? (1986). He is considered one of the most influential drummers of thrash metal, having pioneered the incorporation of jazz fusion into the subgenre.

Samuelson initially cut his teeth playing for The New Yorkers, a stint that lasted from the late '70s into the early '80s. Whether the band actually released any material is unknown. After meeting with Dave Mustaine and Dave Ellefson of Megadeth in 1984, he was asked to join the band. Guitarist Chris Poland soon followed, and Mustaine has since referred to this as "the first real line-up."

Samuelson went on to serve as Megadeth's drummer until 1987. He appeared on the band's first two albums (Killing Is My Business... and Business Is Good, and Peace Sells... but Who's Buying), and played with them on both tours. However, Samuelson was ultimately fired due to his drug addiction and pawning band equipment for drug money with Chris Poland. After leaving Megadeth, he played in the band Fatal Opera, which also featured his brother Stew on guitar. Samuelson played on two full-length albums and two demos, and remained a member of the band until his death.

Samuelson died in Orange City, Florida, on July 14, 1999, at the age of 41. The cause of death was reportedly liver failure. His former bandmates in Megadeth dedicated the 2002 remaster of Killing Is My Business... and Business Is Good to "the memory of Gar Samuelson".

Discography 
Megadeth
 Killing Is My Business... and Business Is Good! (1985)
 Peace Sells... but Who's Buying? (1986)
Fatal Opera
 Fatal Opera (1995)
 The Eleventh Hour (1997)

References 

1958 births
1999 deaths
People from Orange City, Florida
Musicians from New York (state)
American jazz drummers
American heavy metal drummers
Megadeth members
Deaths from liver failure
People from Dunkirk, New York
American people of Swedish descent
20th-century American drummers
American male drummers
Jazz musicians from New York (state)
American male jazz musicians
20th-century American male musicians